Early general elections were held in the Faroe Islands on 8 December 2022. The opposition Social Democratic Party led by former Prime Minister Aksel V. Johannesen emerged as the largest party, receiving the largest vote share of any party since 1990, while Self-Government lost its Løgting representation for the first time since 1945.

Background
Following the 2019 general elections a coalition government was formed by Union Party leader Bárður á Steig Nielsen, consisting of the Union Party, the People's Party and the Centre Party, which together won 17 of the 33 seats.

During the campaign for the November 2022 Danish general election, Centre Party leader and Faroese Minister of Foreign Affairs Jenis av Rana stated that he could not support Søren Pape Poulsen, the leader of the Conservative People's Party, becoming Prime Minister of Denmark as Poulsen is gay.

The opposition parties in the Løgting planned to call a motion of no confidence on 8 November, but Faroese Prime Minister Bárður á Steig Nielsen sacked av Rana the same day. The Centre Party subsequently withdrew from the government, resulting in it losing its majority and Nielsen calling early elections.

Electoral system
Seats were allocated using the largest remainder method.

Opinion polls

Results

Aftermath 
On 22 December 2022, Aksel V. Johannesen was elected prime minister of a coalition governement between Social Democratic, Republic and Progress.

See also
 2022 Danish general election

References

Elections in the Faroe Islands
Faroes
General
Faroes